Cogenerator may refer to:

 Cogeneration, simultaneous generation of heat and electricity
 Injective cogenerator, in mathematics
 More generally, cogenerator is the dual of a generator of a category.
 An operator in the dilation theorem for contraction semigroups